Ferdows Hole-in-the-Rock ( – Sang-e-Sourakh Ferdows) is a natural geological formation  west of Ferdows, South Khorasan Province, Iran.

Description

The formation is a popular attraction in the Mozaffari protected area in Ferdows County. 
This natural attraction, locates 500 meters besides the old road of Ebrahimabad to Kajeh, Chahno and Polond desert.

Gallery

Notes 

Tourist attractions in Ferdows County
Geology of Iran